Saccostrea cucullata, the hooded oyster or Natal rock oyster, is a species of rock oyster found mainly in the Indo-Pacific Ocean.

It was first described by the Czech mineralogist, metallurgist, and malacologist Ignaz von Born in 1778.

Description 

The appearance and form of the hooded oyster is very variable. The shape is sometimes nearly circular or it may be oblong or roughly oval, often with an irregular outline. The valves are thick and solid. The lower valve is convex and has no sculpturing near the umbo, which is fixed to the substrate. The upper valve is flat and smaller than the lower valve. It may have wide, sometimes spiny, ribs but is sometimes quite smooth. The margins of the valves are pleated and fit together neatly. The ligament is internal and no teeth occur on the hinge joint. The right valve has some small denticles on its margin which fit into grooves in the left valve margin. A single large adductor muscle holds the valves together, resulting in a large, kidney-shaped scar on the inside of each valve. The colour is purplish-brown on the outside of the valves. The inside is white rimmed with black. This oyster could be confused with the Pacific oyster (Crassostrea gigas), but is distinguished by having a crenulated margin.

Distribution and habitat 
The hooded oyster is found in the Indian Ocean and tropical west Pacific Ocean. In East Africa, its range includes Somalia, Kenya, Tanzania, and the Seychelles. In India, it is one of a number of commercially exploited oyster species. It is also found in Australia, New Zealand, and the Red Sea. It was first seen in Turkey in 1999 and seems to have become established in the eastern end of the Mediterranean. It is part of the fouling community and is found on harbour walls, pilings, and other underwater structures.

Biology 
The hooded oyster is a filter feeder, pumping water through its gills and removing the phytoplankton. In polluted waters, it accumulates heavy metals in its tissues. For this reason it can be used as a bioindicator for monitoring pollution. Because it selectively removes these metals and is such an efficient biofilter, it has been used in the Persian Gulf to control pollution.

The hooded oyster is tolerant of a wide range of temperatures and salinities. Breeding takes place between June and October in the Northern Hemisphere. The larvae are planktonic and preferentially settle out of the water column in locations  already occupied by adult oysters.

Ecology 
The hooded oyster is common on the east coast of Africa, where it cements itself to rocks or to the branches and roots of mangroves. It sometimes even grows on the shell of a large gastropod mollusc, the mangrove whelk (Terebralia palustris), which grazes beneath the mangrove canopy. In Australia, another gastropod, the black oyster borer or mulberry whelk (Tenguella marginalba, previously Morula marginalba) feeds on the oyster  by drilling a hole through its shell. It then inserts its radula and chews up the body before sucking out the pieces.

References

External links 
 Plate LI shows fossil specimens of S. saccellus (later synonymized with S. cuccullata) compared to a shell of Ostrea edulis.  In Tome XXII (1920) of Memoire no. 27, Conchyliologie du Miogène moyen du Bassin de la Loire by G.-F. Dollfus and Ph. Dautzenberg.  

cucullata
Bivalves described in 1778